Bostaniçi is a town within the metropolitan area of the city of Van, on the Eastern shore of Lake Van in Turkey. The Armenian name of the town was Sghka.

The town is part of the municipality of İpekyolu. The mayor of the municipality is Sinan Aslan. Aslan was appointed by the Turkish government following the arrest of Şehsade Kurt and Azim Yacan of the pro-Kurdish Peoples’ Democratic Party (HDP) on 8 November 2019.

Bostaniçi is located at the foot of Erek Mountain, the highest mountain of Van. As of 2018, the population of the town was 30,412.

References 

Van, Turkey